The climate of Ghana is tropical. The eastern coastal belt is warm and comparatively dry, the south-west corner of Ghana is hot and humid, and the north of Ghana is hot and dry. Ghana is located on the Gulf of Guinea, only a few degrees north of the Equator, giving it a warm climate.

Climate
The climate of Ghana is tropical and there are two main seasons: the wet and the dry seasons. North Ghana experiences its rainy season from April to mid-October while South Ghana experiences its rainy season from March to mid-November. The tropical climate of Ghana is relatively mild for its latitude. The harmattan, a dry desert wind, blows in north-east Ghana from December to March, lowering the humidity and causing hotter days and cooler nights in northern part of Ghana. 

Average daily temperatures range from 30°C (86°F) during the day to 24°C (75°F) at night with a relative humidity between 77 percent and 85 percent. In the southern part of Ghana, there is a bi-modal rainy season: April through June and September through November. Squalls occur in the northern part of Ghana during March and April, followed by occasional rain until August and September, when the rainfall reaches its peak. Rainfall ranges from 78 to 216 centimeters (31 to 85 inches) a year.

Climate change in Ghana

References

External links
 Ghana – Weather Averages

Environment of Ghana
Ghana
Ghana